The 2002 Veterans Day weekend tornado outbreak was an unusually severe and expansive severe weather event across portions of the Central and Eastern United States from the evening hours of November 9 into the early morning hours of Veterans Day, November 11, 2002. A series of troughs tracked eastward across the United States, providing strong wind shear, while anomalously warm and unstable air surged northward into the Ohio River Valley. As a result, multiple tornadoes occurred across Arkansas, Tennessee, and Missouri on November 9. A far more widespread and severe event occurred the following day, with three distinct tornado outbreaks focused across areas from Illinois to Pennsylvania; Tennessee and Kentucky; and areas from Mississippi to South Carolina. The most intense tornado of the outbreak was a violent F4 tornado that occurred near Van Wert, Ohio. A total of 76 tornadoes occurred during the 3-day period, collectively resulting in 36 deaths and 303 injuries. As of 2022, the event ranks as the third-largest tornado outbreak on record in November.

Meteorological synopsis

November 9
The first signs for organized severe weather became apparent on November 7, when the Storm Prediction Center (SPC) outlined a Slight risk across portions of the mid-Mississippi and western Ohio River valleys valid for November 9. While a shortwave trough at the leading edge of this feature progressed across the Texas Panhandle, a surface area of low pressure resided across the Central and Northern Plains. Southerly flow associated with the cyclone prompted the northward advection of moisture from the Gulf of Mexico, with dewpoints rising into the lower 60s °F as far north as southern Illinois; this moisture promoted modest destabilization and mid-level convective available potential energy (CAPE) values from 500–1,000 J/kg. As the shortwave trough continued eastward, it aided in the formation of thunderstorms across northeastern Arkansas around 00:00 UTC. These storms resided in a strongly sheared environment, with storm relative helicity – a measure of the potential for cyclonic updrafts – around 800 m2/s2. Despite initial concern that the lower levels of the atmosphere were not quite as favorable, evening atmospheric soundings from Little Rock, Arkansas, and Memphis, Tennessee, showcased an extremely favorable environment for significant tornadoes. Clusters of supercells tracked from Arkansas into Tennessee over ensuing hours, and in fact, the persistence of these storms resulted in the formation of a weak outflow boundary that further enhanced the tornado threat. A total of 10 tornadoes occurred throughout the evening of November 9, including multiple strong tornadoes and one that killed two people near Huntingdon, Tennessee.

November 10–11

On November 10, the SPC warned of the potential for a significant tornado outbreak and/or widespread damaging wind episode across northeastern Mississippi, much of Tennessee, northwestern Alabama, and much of Kentucky, where the organization issued a High risk of severe weather. At the surface, a strong area of low pressure was positioned over Wisconsin and moving northeastward toward Ontario. Throughout the afternoon hours, the tornado outbreak unfolded in three distinct locations. To the north across Indiana and Ohio, temperatures rose into the lower 70s and dewpoints climbed into the mid-60s °F, supporting CAPE values of 1,000–2,000 J/kg. In addition, significant pressure falls in the region contributed to backed surface winds, aiding in favorable low-level shear profiles. Although storms in this region were initially congealed into a squall line ahead of a cold front, the presence of strong shear and dry air in the mid-levels supported the line's breakdown into supercells and bowing segments. Ahead of this activity, additional discrete supercells overspread much of Ohio owing to a prefrontal trough. An F3 tornado near Tiffin killed one person and injured two others. An F2 tornado in Clark, Pennsylvania, killed 1 person. Numerous other tornadoes were recorded throughout the afternoon. The event evolved into more of a significant damaging wind episode as storms progressed farther east into Pennsylvania by the evening hours.

With the northern outbreak unfolding, a central outbreak simultaneously overspread portions of Tennessee and Kentucky, while a southern outbreak spanned areas from Mississippi into South Carolina. Surface observations and atmospheric soundings across the High and Moderate risk areas showed a very unstable environment with surface-based CAPE values in the 2,000–3,000 J/kg range. Despite the presence of a cap, this inversion was weak and expected to be eroded by warming daytime temperatures. Meanwhile, deep-layer wind shear of  overspread the area. Though shear profiles were largely unidirectional initially, low-level winds were expected to become more conducive for discrete supercells and tornadoes. Multiple swaths of supercells developed throughout the region, including one in middle Tennessee, a second from central Mississippi into northwestern Alabama, and a third from northeastern Louisiana into central Mississippi. Fatal tornadoes occurred near Shelbyville, Joyner, and Crossville in Tennessee;  Carbon Hill,  Saragossa, and Centre in Alabama; and Crawford in Mississippi. Numerous other tornadoes were documented throughout the area. Much like the outbreak farther north, the event transitioned into more of a damaging wind event by the evening hours, though a few tornadoes still occurred during the early morning hours across Georgia and South Carolina.

Confirmed tornadoes

November 9 event

November 10 event

November 11 event

See also
November 1989 tornado outbreak
Tornado outbreak of November 14–16, 2006

Notes

References

External links

 Veterans Day Tornado Outbreak (NWS Birmingham, Alabama)
 November 10, 2002 (NWS Huntsville, Alabama)
 Severe Weather Event - November 10-11, 2002 (NWS Jackson, Mississippi)
 Tornadoes in Middle Tennessee on November 10, 2002 (NWS Nashville, Tennessee)
 Tornadoes devastate parts of northwest Ohio and northeast Indiana (NWS Northern Indiana)
 Severe Weather Outbreak - November 10, 2002 (Midwestern Regional Climate Center)
 NWS Service Assessment
 The severe weather outbreak of 10 November 2002: Lightning and radar analysis of storms in the deep South (22nd Conference on Severe Local Storms, American Meteorological Society)
 Video of the Van Wert, Ohio F4 tornado, from the Ohio State Highway Patrol.

F4 tornadoes by date
Tornadoes of 2002
Tornadoes in Alabama
Tornadoes in Indiana
Tornadoes in Mississippi
Tornadoes in Ohio
Tornadoes in Pennsylvania
Tornadoes in Tennessee
Veterans Day Weekend Tornado Outbreak
Tornado outbreak 2002-11-09